E. C. Was Here is a 1975 album by Eric Clapton. It was recorded live in 1974 and 1975 at the Nassau Coliseum, Uniondale, New York, Long Beach Arena, the Hammersmith Odeon, and the Providence Civic Center by Record Plant Remote during Clapton's first tour since Derek and the Dominos in 1970.

An expanded version was included as discs 3 and 4 of Give Me Strength: The 1974/1975 Recordings.

Track listing
Side one
"Have You Ever Loved a Woman" (Billy Myles) (Long Beach Arena, Long Beach, California, 19 July 1974) – 7:52
"Presence of the Lord" (Eric Clapton) (Long Beach Arena, Long Beach, California, 20 July 1974) – 6:40
"Driftin' Blues" (Johnny Moore, Charles Brown, Eddie Williams) (Long Beach Arena, Long Beach, California, 20 July 1974) – 3:25 (LP)/11:43 (CD)
Side two
"Can't Find My Way Home" (Steve Winwood) (Long Beach Arena, Long Beach, California, 19 July 1974) – 5:20
"Ramblin' on My Mind" (Robert Johnson) (Hammersmith Odeon, London, 4 December 1974) – 7:20
"Further on Up the Road" (Joe Medwick, Don Robey) (Nassau Coliseum, Uniondale, New York, 28 June 1975) – 7:36

Disc 3 of Give Me Strength The 1974/1975 Recordings
"Smile" (Long Beach Arena, Long Beach, California, 20 July 1974) – 3:36
"Have You Ever Loved A Woman" (Long Beach Arena, Long Beach, California, 19 July 1974) – 7:41
"Presence of the Lord" (Long Beach Arena, Long Beach, California, 20 July 1974) – 8:47
"Crossroads" (Long Beach Arena, Long Beach, California, 20 July 1974) – 4:39
"I Shot The Sheriff" (Previously Unreleased-Long Beach Arena, Long Beach, California, 20 July 1974) – 7:35
"Layla" (Long Beach Arena, Long Beach, California, 20 July 1974) – 6:00
"Little Wing" (Long Beach Arena, Long Beach, California, 20 July 1974) – 8:57
"Can't Find My Way Home" (Long Beach Arena, Long Beach, California, 20 July 1974) – 5:18
"Driftin' Blues/Ramblin' On My Mind" (Long Beach Arena, Long Beach, California, 20 July 1974) – 11:38

Disc 4 of Give Me Strength The 1974/1975 Recordings
"Ramblin' On My Mind/Have You Ever Loved A Woman" (Hammersmith Odeon, London, 4 December 1974) – 8:15
"Willie and the Hand Jive/Get Ready" (Long Beach Arena, Long Beach, California, 20 July 1974) – 11:27
"The Sky Is Crying/Have You Ever Loved A Woman/Ramblin' On My Mind" (Hammersmith Odeon, London, 5 December 1974) – 7:26
"Badge" (Nassau Coliseum, Uniondale New York, 28 June 1975) – 10:44
"Driftin' Blues" (Providence Civic Center, Providence, Rhode Island, 25 June 1975) – 6:55
"Eyesight to the Blind/Why Does Love Got to Be So Sad?" (Providence Civic Center Providence, Rhode Island, 25 June 1975) – 20:50
"Further on Up the Road" (Nassau Coliseum, Uniondale New York, 28 June 1975) – 7:35

Personnel 
 Eric Clapton – guitar, vocals
 Yvonne Elliman – vocals
 George Terry –  guitar
 Dick Sims – organ
 Carl Radle – bass guitar
 Jamie Oldaker – drums
 Marcy Levy – tambourine

Additional personnel
 Wally Heider – engineer
 Ed Barton – engineer
 Brian Engolds – engineer
 Ralph Moss – engineer
 David Hewitt – engineer

Chart performance

Weekly charts

Year-end charts

Certifications

References 

Eric Clapton live albums
Albums produced by Tom Dowd
1975 live albums
RSO Records live albums
Albums recorded at the Hammersmith Apollo